The 2017–18 Drake Bulldogs men's basketball team represented Drake University during the 2017–18 NCAA Division I men's basketball season. The Bulldogs were led by first-year head coach Niko Medved. They played their home games at Knapp Center in Des Moines, Iowa as members of the Missouri Valley Conference. They finished the season 17–17, 10–8 in MVC play to finish in to finish in a tie for third place. They lost in the quarterfinals of the MVC tournament to Bradley. They were invited to the CollegeInsider.com Tournament where they defeated Abilene Christian in the first round in a game referred to as the Lou Henson Classic. In the second round they were defeated by Northern Colorado.

On March 22, 2018, it was announced that head coach Niko Medved had accepted the head coaching position at Colorado State, where he had previously served as an assistant. A week after Medved's departure, Drake hired Creighton assistant and Iowa native Darian DeVries for the head coaching job.

Previous season 
The Bulldogs finished the 2016–17 season They finished the season 7–24, 5–13 to finish in a tie for ninth place in MVC play. They lost in the first round of the Missouri Valley Conference tournament to Bradley.

Fourth-year head coach Ray Giacoletti resigned on December 6, 2016 after the first eight games of the season. Assistant coach Jeff Rutter was named interim head coach. Following the season, the school chose not to keep Jeff Rutter as head coach and hired Niko Medved, former head coach at Furman, as the Bulldogs' new head coach.

Offseason

Departures

2017 recruiting class

2018 recruiting class

Preseason 
In the conference's preseason poll, the Bulldogs were picked to finish in last place in the MVC. Senior guard Reed Timmer was named to the preseason All-MVC first team.

Roster

Schedule and results

|-
!colspan=9 style=| Exhibition

|-
!colspan=9 style=| Non-conference regular season

|-
!colspan=9 style=| MVC regular season

|-
!colspan=9 style=| MVC tournament

|-
!colspan=9 style=| CIT

References

Drake Bulldogs men's basketball seasons
Drake
Drake
Drake
Drake